Parker School may refer to:

Parker School, Kamuela, Hawaii
Lower Parker School, Salem, Missouri 
Francis W. Parker School, Chicago
Parker High School Auditorium, City View, South Carolina

See also
Parker House (disambiguation)
Parker Building (disambiguation)